Slow, Deep and Hard is the debut studio album by the American gothic metal band Type O Negative, released in 1991 on Roadrunner Records.

Overview
The album, originally titled None More Negative and released in 1990 under the group's former name Repulsion, launched the band's career. Slow, Deep and Hard is a darkly humorous, semi-autobiographical album with tracks 1, 3, 4 and 7 based on a failed relationship of vocalist/bass guitarist Peter Steele. The album's other tracks are "Der Untermensch" (Steele's controversial critique of people, frequently immigrants, abusing the American welfare system), "Glass Walls of Limbo (Dance Mix)" (a facetiously titled ambient industrial soundscape) and "The Misinterpretation of Silence and its Disastrous Consequences" (a literal minute of silence). In keeping with the band's notable humor, the album's cover artwork is a close-up image of vaginal penetration.

According to guitarist Kenny Hickey, Steele based the main riff of "Gravitational Constant: G = 6.67 × 10−8 cm−3 gm−1 sec−2" (later known as "Gravity") from the theme song of the 1964 American sitcom The Munsters.

Roadrunner Records released a remastered version of Slow, Deep and Hard on March 24, 2009.

For the 30th anniversary of Slow, Deep and Hard, Roadrunner Records, in conjunction with Run Out Groove, reissued the debut on vinyl.

Track listing
All lyrics and music by Peter Steele, unless noted.

Personnel 
 Peter Steele – lead vocals, bass
 Kenny Hickey – guitars, backing vocals
 Josh Silver – keyboards, backing vocals, samples
 Sal Abruscato – drums

Production
Michael Marciano – engineering
Michael Sarsfield – mastering

Charts

References

Type O Negative albums
1991 debut albums
Roadrunner Records albums